Lucknow is a locality in the East Gippsland region of Victoria, Australia, on the Mitchell River and adjacent to the regional centre of Bairnsdale.

References

External links

Towns in Victoria (Australia)
Shire of East Gippsland